Events in the year 2020 in Grenada.

Incumbents 

 Monarch: Elizabeth II
 Governor-General: Dame Cécile La Grenade
 Prime Minister: Keith Mitchell

Events 
Ongoing — COVID-19 pandemic in Grenada

 January 1 –  2021 New Year Honours

 March 22 – Grenada reports its first confirmed case of COVID-19.
 March 29 – The Government announces 24-hour curfew lasting one week.
 April 6 – The Government extends the curfew/lockdown for a further two weeks.
 April 18 – The Government extends the lockdown for another week.
 10 May – The Government eases COVID-19 restrictions.

Sports 

 2019–20 GFA Premier League

References 

 
2020s in Grenada
Years of the 21st century in Grenada
Grenada
Grenada